Hear My Cry may refer to:
Hear My Cry (1991 film)
Hear My Cry (album), a 2000 album by Sonique
Hear My Cry, a 1997 album by Rayvon